"Fire" is a song by English rock band Kasabian and is the lead single from their third album, West Ryder Pauper Lunatic Asylum.  It was released 1 June 2009. On the week of its release, it debuted at number 3 on the UK Singles Chart, making it their first UK top-three entry and their highest-charting single to date as well as their fourth UK top-ten single. "Fire" also debuted at number one in Scotland, becoming Kasabian's highest-charting single there as well. On the Australian ARIA Singles Chart, it debuted at number 44 peaked at number 41.

The song was featured in Callaway's 2010 Super Bowl commercial. The song was the official song of the Premier League from the 2010–11 season up to the 2012–13 season. This meant the song (different segments of it) was present in most of the BPL Shows produced by Premier League Productions which was broadcast around the world. A purported remix of the song is still currently the theme tune of Kick Off, the show produced by PL Productions before the main Matchday Live coverage. The song is also currently used by the band's home town team, Leicester City as goal music.  It is also featured in the F1 2010 video game.

In October 2011, NME placed it at number 65 on its list "150 Best Tracks of the Past 15 Years".

Background

One morning, guitarist Serge Pizzorno was improvising in the studio, and played the slow guitar rhythm heard in the verse. He suggested singer Tom Meighan sing the verses like Elvis. Pizzorno had another idea for a groovier song which wound up being the chorus, and stitched it together with the Elvis part "for a laugh", then realized it sounded great. Pizzorno described it as "like a band being onstage and then another band sort of elbowing them off stage to play the chorus." 

Meighan said the song is "about bondage and being whipped and being seduced", while Pizzorno said it is about unusual, special events such as rolling two sixes in dice, or kicking a ball through a hole.

Chart performance
Following its release in June 2009, "Fire" managed to peak at number three on the UK Singles Chart and number one on the Scottish Singles Chart, making it Kasabian's most successful song to date in both countries. The song also managed to enter the Australian ARIA Singles Chart at number 44 before moving up to a new peak of number 41 the following week. In Ireland, the song peaked at number 31, and in Belgium, the song was a moderate success, charting on the Ultratip charts in Flanders and Wallonia.

Music video
The video for "Fire" is available to view on the band's website, and is also available for purchase on iTunes. It was directed by acclaimed British director W.I.Z. and portrays a bank robbery gone wrong, with guitars taking the place of firearms. Near the end of this video, when Sergio Pizzorno throws the stolen goods against the wall, the viewer can see that what they have stolen is actually sheets of music. The video is very similar to Judas Priest's "Breaking the Law".

The music video was filmed on location Cape Town, South Africa.

Track listings
UK 10-inch single 
A. "Fire"
B. "Fire" (Richard Fearless Mix)

European and Australian CD single 
 "Fire" – 4:11
 "Runaway" (live from The Little Noise Sessions) – 4:08

Digital download
 "Fire" – 4:11

Digital EP
 "Fire" – 4:12
 "Runaway" (live) – 4:09
 "Road Kill Cafe" – 2:39

Personnel
Tom Meighan – vocals
Sergio Pizzorno – vocals, guitar, synths
Chris Edwards – bass
Ian Matthews – drums, percussion, vibraslap

Charts

Weekly charts

Year-end charts

Certifications

References

External links
 https://web.archive.org/web/20120222064132/http://www.townsend-records.co.uk/sites/kasabian/
 http://www.rcarecords.com/home.php

2009 singles
2009 songs
Columbia Records singles
Kasabian songs
Number-one singles in Scotland
Songs written by Sergio Pizzorno
Sony Music UK singles